Megachile pulvinata is a species of bee in the family Megachilidae. It was described by Chlerogas Vachal in 1910.

References

Pulvinata
Insects described in 1910